Christopher Trimmel (born 24 February 1987) is an Austrian professional footballer who plays as a right back or wing back for Bundesliga club Union Berlin and the  Austria national team.

Club career
Born in Oberpullendorf, Trimmel started his career at local club USC Mannersdorf. He switched to ASK Horitschon, where he played for two seasons until he was discovered by Rapid Wien.

Trimmel signed with Rapid in 2008, and initially played for the amateurs, but quickly managed to receive a place in the first-team squad. On 2 August 2009, in his sixth league game, he scored a hat-trick in only six minutes in a 5–1 victory over Austria Kärnten.

In February 2014, Trimmel signed with Union Berlin for the new season. In May 2017, he extended his contract until 2019.

International career
On 5 August 2009, it was announced that Trimmel was a part of the national team squad for the upcoming friendly match against Cameroon. He has since represented his country seven times, after a nine-year hiatus in 2019 again.

International goal
Scores and results list Austria's goal tally first.

Career statistics

Club

References

External links

 
 

1987 births
Living people
Footballers from Burgenland
People from Oberpullendorf District
Austrian footballers
Austria international footballers
SK Rapid Wien players
1. FC Union Berlin players
Austrian Football Bundesliga players
2. Bundesliga players
Association football wingers
Association football forwards
Bundesliga players
UEFA Euro 2020 players
Austrian expatriate footballers
Austrian expatriate sportspeople in Germany
Expatriate footballers in Germany